Helen Rees OBE GCOB is a medical researcher and the founder and Executive Director of the Wits Reproductive Health and HIV Institute (Wits RHI) of the University of Witwatersrand. She has led many HIV prevention and sexual and reproductive health studies and advised on vaccination strategies to help prevent various medical conditions.

Education 
Rees obtained her Medical Degree and Masters in Social and Political Sciences from New Hall College (now Murray Edwards College) at Cambridge University, and is now a Fellow of the College. She is an alumnus of Harvard Business School having completed the HBS Senior Executive Programme for Southern Africa.

Career 
Rees is a Personal Professor in the Wits Department of Obstetrics and Gynaecology, where she is developing of Wits University's Flagship Centre for Vaccinology with Professor Shabir Madhi (RMPRU). Rees is an Honorary Professor in the Department of Clinical Research at the London School of Hygiene and Tropical Medicine.

Committees and advisory work 
Rees is the chair of the South African Medicines Control Council, Chair of the MCC EXCO, a member of South Africa's National Advisory Group on Immunizationand is a member of the National Health Data Advisory and Coordination Committee chairing the TB/HIV committee. She is part of the National Department of Science and Technology panel reviewing South Africa's science and technology and innovation institutional landscape. Rees is a member of the Scientific Advisory Committee of the National Institute of Communicable Diseases.

She was the Protocol Chair of the first SA microbicide network trial (FACTS 001), a Phase 3 trial of 1% tenofovir gel for HIV prevention. Rees is a lead researcher on a pan African study on HIV acquisition and contraception (ECHO), and is the co-principal investigator in a study evaluating the feasibility of using ARVS for HIV prevention as pre-exposure prophylaxis and early treatment for female sex workers.

Rees serves on numerous scientific committees and boards, including for WHO, UNAIDS, NIH, IAVI, GAVI, the Population Council and Wellcome Trust. She is Chair of WHO's African Regional Task Force on Immunization (TFI), past chair of the World Health Organisation's Strategic Advisory Group of Experts on Immunization (SAGE), and was SAGE focal point for HPV, Rubella, and HIV vaccines, and vaccine use in humanitarian emergencies. She is a member of the SAGE Working Group on Measles and Rubella, and of the SAGE Working Group monitoring the progress of the Global Vaccine Action Plan, the chair of the WHO/PATH Advisory Committee on Maternal Influenza Immunisation, a member of the WHO's Polio Research Group and of WHO's Technical advisory Committee on RSV Vaccines.

Rees is the current Chair of the WHO SAGE Working Group on Ebola Vaccines, the TFI Working group on Ebola and she chaired the WHO ‘High Level Meeting’ on Ebola vaccines. She is the chair of the WHO’s International Health Regulations Emergency Committee on Polio as well as the WHO Committee currently reviewing the WHO's International Health Regulations.

She chaired the WHO Committee on the STV Vaccine Roadmap and continues to advise WHO on STI vaccine development and on STI strategy. She is a board member of AVAC (a global HIV Prevention research advocacy organization) and serves on the US National Institute of Health’s Scientific Advisory Committee for the HIV Prevention Network, the Population Council’s Microbicide Advisory Committee, the WHO/UNAIDS Steering Committee on Pre-exposure prophylaxis, and the Center for HIV/AIDS Vaccine Immunology Immunogen Discovery (CHAVI-ID) Scientific Advisory Board.

Awards and honours 
In 2001 Rees was made an Officer of the Order of the British Empire. She was awarded the 2015 silver Order of the Baobab by the President of South Africa for exceptional and distinguished contributions in medicine. In 2015 Rees was awarded the National Science and Technology Foundations’ Lifetime Achievement Award. She was awarded the 2014 Harry Oppenheimer Fellowship given to a leading scholar who has a sustained a record of outstanding research and intellectual achievement at the highest level.

In 2006 she was elected as a member of the Academy of Science of South Africa (ASSAf) member, and in 2010 was awarded the SA Academy of Science's Gold Award for outstanding achievement in scientific thinking to the benefit of society. She was awarded Wits University's Vice-Chancellor's Research Award (2012), Wits’ highest research recognition, and Wits Faculty of Health Sciences recognition for dedication and achievement in research (2013). She was the London School of Hygiene and Tropical Medicine's 2011 International Heath Clark lecturer awarded to an outstanding global health practitioner. The SA National Research Forum rates her as an outstanding international scientist. She was the first person to receive the SA Department of Science and Technology's award for the ‘Distinguished Scientist recognised for outstanding contribution to improving the quality of life of women’ (2006).

References

External links

Schultz, Debbi. The activist changing health policy on global scale. Mail & Guardian. 10 July 2015.

Year of birth missing (living people)
Living people
Alumni of New Hall, Cambridge
Harvard Business School alumni
World Health Organization officials
Academic staff of the University of the Witwatersrand
South African officials of the United Nations
Members of the Academy of Science of South Africa
Order of the Baobab
Officers of the Order of the British Empire
South African medical researchers